Sparganothis flavibasana is a species of moth of the family Tortricidae. It is found in North America, including Illinois, Iowa, Manitoba, Ontario, Quebec and Saskatchewan.

The wingspan is about 20 mm.

References

Moths described in 1882
Sparganothis